Sayner is a census-designated place in the Town of Plum Lake in Vilas County, Wisconsin, United States. It is located at the intersection of Highway 155 and County N, about 15 miles northwest of Eagle River. As of the 2010 census, its population was 207.
Sayner got its name from Orrin W. Sayner, who settled the area in 1891, two years before any other settlers took up homes in the town.
In 1895, the Milwaukee Road extended its Valley Line north from Woodruff to Star Lake, with a stop in Sayner. The line primarily carried lumber from area forests, later carried tourists and had been abandoned in the middle 20th century.

Sayner is home to the Vilas County Historical Society.

The community is the birthplace of the snowmobile, with the first "motor toboggan" built by Carl Eliason in 1924.

Sayner is also home to one of the nation's oldest summer camps, Camp Highlands for Boys, founded in 1904, and located on the northeast end of Plum Lake.

Located on the south shore of Plum Lake, the Plum Lake Golf Course is the oldest nine-hole golf course in Wisconsin, founded in 1912.

See also
 List of census-designated places in Wisconsin

References

External links

 Vilas County Historical Museum

Census-designated places in Wisconsin
Census-designated places in Vilas County, Wisconsin